The 1999 Torneo Internazionali Femminili di Palermo singles was the singles event of the twelfth edition of the second most prestigious women's tennis tournament held in Italy. Patty Schnyder was the defending champion, but she did not compete this year.

Qualifier and World No. 196 Anastasia Myskina won in the final, 3–6, 7–6(7–3), 6–2, against Ángeles Montolio, to win her first WTA title.

Seeds

Draw

Finals

Top half

Bottom half

Qualifying

Seeds

Qualifiers

Lucky losers

Qualifying draw

First qualifier

Second qualifier

Third qualifier

Fourth qualifier

References
 ITF singles results page

Singles
Torneo Internazionali Femminili di Palermo - Singles